David Snow is a former American college baseball coach.  He served as head coach of the Loyola Marymount Lions baseball team, leading them to the 1986 College World Series and later as the head coach of the Long Beach State 49ers baseball team, whom he led to the College World Series in 1989, 1991, 1993, and 1998.  He retired from coaching in 2001 after a 29 year career that also included a head coaching job at Los Angeles Valley College and time as an assistant to Cal State Fullerton coach Augie Garrido.

Playing career
Snow played third base at Bellflower High School in Bellflower, California. He was drafted in the 17th round of the 1968 Major League Baseball Draft by the Houston Astros. Snow decided not to sign with Houston, and attended Cerritos College. Snow was the third baseman for the Falcons for the 1969 and 1970 seasons. He would go on to play two seasons at Cal Poly under Augie Garrido. He led the Mustangs in doubles (8) and RBIs (31) in 1971.

Coaching career
Snow followed Garrido to Cal State Fullerton, where he became an assistant. In 1978, he left to become the head coach at Los Angeles Valley College. He went 156–41 at Los Angeles Valley, winning four consecutive conference championships. He returned to assisting at Cal State Fullerton in 1983 and 1984, before leaving to become the head coach of the Loyola Marymount Lions baseball team in 1985.

Head coaching record

References

External links

Living people
Cerritos Falcons baseball players
Cal Poly Mustangs baseball players
Cal State Fullerton Titans baseball coaches
Loyola Marymount Lions baseball coaches
Long Beach State Dirtbags baseball coaches
Colorado Rockies scouts
Year of birth missing (living people)